Czechs in France refers to the phenomenon of Czech people migrating to France from the Czech Republic or from the political entities that preceded it, such as Czechoslovakia. There is a substantial number of people in France with Czech ancestry, including 100,220 Czech-born people recorded as resident in France. One notable Czech-French writer is Milan Kundera.

Notable people

See also 
 Czech Republic–France relations
 Demographics of the Czech Republic
 Czech people
 Immigration to France
 Polish minority in France
 Germans in France

References

France
France
 
European diaspora in France